The Mari language (Mari: , marij jylme; , mariyskiy yazyk), formerly known as the Cheremiss language, spoken by approximately 400,000 people, belongs to the Uralic language family. It is spoken primarily in the Mari Republic (Mari: , Marij El, i.e., 'Mari land') of the Russian Federation as well as in the area along the Vyatka river basin and eastwards to the Urals. Mari speakers, known as the Mari, are found also in the Tatarstan, Bashkortostan, Udmurtia, and Perm regions.

Mari is the titular and official language of its republic, alongside Russian.

The Mari language today has three standard forms: Hill Mari, Northwestern Mari, and Meadow Mari. The latter is predominant and spans the continuum Meadow Mari to Eastern Mari from the Republic into the Ural dialects of Bashkortostan, Sverdlovsk Oblast and Udmurtia), whereas the former, Hill Mari, shares a stronger affiliation with the Northwestern dialect (spoken in the Nizhny Novgorod Oblast and parts of the Kirov Oblast). Both language forms use modified versions of Cyrillic script. For the non-native, Hill Mari, or Western Mari, can be recognized by its use of the special letters "ӓ" and "ӹ" in addition to the mutual letters "ӱ" and "ӧ", while Eastern and Meadow Mari utilize a special letter "ҥ".

The use of two "variants", as opposed to two "languages", has been debated: Maris recognize the unity of the ethnic group, and the two forms are very close, but distinct enough to cause some problems with communication.

Ethnonym and glottonym 
The Mari language and people were known as "Cheremis" (cheremisy, cheremisskiy yazyk). The term Mari comes from the Maris' autonym .

Sociolinguistic situation 
Most Maris live in rural areas with slightly more than a quarter living in cities. In the republic's capital, Yoshkar-Ola, the percentage of Maris is just over 23 percent. At the end of the 1980s (per the 1989 census) Maris numbered 670,868, of whom 80% (542,160) claimed Mari as their first language and 18.8% did not speak Mari. In the Mari Republic, 11.6% claimed Mari was not their first language. In a survey by the Mari Research Institute more than three quarters of Maris surveyed considered Mari language to be the most crucial marker of ethnic identity, followed by traditional culture (61%) and common historical past (22%), religion (16%), character and mentality (15%) and appearance (11%) (see Glukhov and Glukhov for details). A gradual downward trend towards assimilation to Russian has been noted for the Communist period: the 1926 census indicated more than 99% of Maris considered Mari their first language, declining to less than 81% in 1989. Some qualitative evidence of a reversal in recent years has been noted.

There was no state support for Mari language in Imperial Russia, and with the exception of some enthusiasts and numerous ecclesiastical texts by the Russian Orthodox Church, there was almost no education in Mari language. After the October Revolution, there was a period of support of all lesser national cultures in the Soviet Union, but eventually Russification returned. While the development of Mari literary language continued, still, only elementary-school education was available in Mari in the Soviet period, with this policy ending in village schools in the 1970–1980s. The period of glasnost and perestroika in the 1990s opened opportunities for a revival of efforts expand the use of Mari in education and the public sphere. In the 1990s, the Mari language, alongside Russian, was proclaimed in the republican constitution to be an official language of Mari El. By the beginning of the 21st century, Mari language and literature was taught in 226 schools. At the History and Philology Department of the Mari State University and the Krupskaya Teachers' Training Institute (Yoshkar-Ola), more than half of the subjects are taught in Mari.

Dialects 

The principal division between Mari varieties is the West and the East. According to the Soviet linguist Kovedyaeva (1976:9-15, 1993:163-164) the Mari macrolanguage is divided into four main dialects:
 Hill Mari, spoken mainly on the right upper bank of the Volga River around Kozmodemyansk (hence the name), but also on the left bank and in the mouth of Vetluga.
 Northwestern Mari
 Meadow Mari, spoken on the left Volgan bank on the central and eastern plain ("meadow") of Mari El around the republican capital, Yoshkar-Ola.
 Eastern Mari is scattered to the east of Mari El from Vyatka through Kama to Ufa.
Each main dialect is divided into their own smaller local subdialects. Only Hill and Meadow Mari have their own literary written standard varieties, based on the dialects of Kozmodemyansk and Yoshkar-Ola respectively.

Eastern and Meadow Mari are often united as a Meadow-Eastern supra-dialect. Northwestern Mari is transitional between the Hill and Meadow dialects, and its phonology and morphology are closer to Hill Mari.

Orthography 

Mari is mostly written with the Cyrillic script.

Phonology

Vowels 

 Only in Hill Mari
The schwa  and its fronted counterpart are usually transcribed in Finno-Ugric transcription as ə̑ (reduced mid unrounded vowel) and ə (reduced front unrounded vowel) respectively. Descriptions vary on the degree of backness and labialization.

Word prosody 
Stress is not phonemic in Mari, but a dynamic stress system is exhibited phonetically, the stressed syllable being higher in pitch and amplitude and greater in length than an unstressed syllable. Generally, there is one prominent syllable per word and prominence may be found in any syllable of the word. Post- and prefixes behave as clitics, i.e., they do not have their own stress. For example, пӧ́рт (pört, "house") гыч (gəč, "out of"); or му́ро (muro, "song") дене (dene, "with").

Consonants 
Consonants are shown in Cyrillic, Latin, and the IPA:

 Only in Russian loanwords, in Hill Mari also onomatopoeia and Chuvashian loanwords.
 Palatalisation is marked in different ways. If the vowel following a palatalised consonant is an е or an и, palatalisation is not marked at all. In other cases, the soft sign ь is used to mark palatalisation.
Although Hill Mari has this sound too, this character is only used in Meadow Mari.
 In Russian loanwords and after nasals,  are voiced stops. Word-finally and before a consonant, there is free variation between voiced fricatives and voiceless stops .

Phonological processes 

Like several other Uralic languages, Mari has vowel harmony. In addition to front/back harmony, Mari also features round/unround harmony. If the stressed vowel in the word is rounded, then the suffix will contain a rounded vowel: for example, кӱтӱ́ ([kyˈty] 'herd') becomes кӱтӱ́штӧ ([kyˈtyʃtø], 'in the herd'); if the stressed vowel is unrounded, then the suffix will contain an unrounded vowel: ки́д ([kid], 'hand') becomes ки́дыште ([ˈkidəʃte], 'in the hand'). If the stressed vowel is back, then the suffix will end in a back vowel: агу́р ([aˈgur], 'whirlpool') becomes агу́рышто ([aˈgurəʃto], 'in the whirlpool').

Declension 

Like other Uralic languages, Mari is an agglutinating language. It lacks grammatical gender, and does not use articles.

Case 
Meadow Mari has 9 productive cases, of which 3 are locative cases. The usage of the latter ones is restricted to inanimate objects.

Many cases, aside from their basic function, are used in other situations, such as in expressions of time.
 Nominative, used for subjects, predicatives and for other grammatical functions.
 Genitive, is used for possessive constructions.
 Dative, the indirect object's case.
 Accusative, the direct object's case.
 Comitative, used when a subject or an object can be split up into parts, or in adverbials expressing the involvement of an object in an action.
 Comparative, used to express the likeness to something.
 Inessive, used to state where something is.
 Illative, used to state where something is going.
 Lative, used to express into what something is going.

If a locative statement was to be made about an animate object, postpositions would be used.

Additionally, terms denoting family members have vocative forms. These are, however, not created with a specific paradigm, and only exist in a few pre-defined cases.

Hill Mari has these cases, plus the abessive case (of the form -де), which is used to form adverbials stating without the involvement or influence of which an action happens.

Number 
Mari, though an agglutinative language, does not have a separate morpheme to signify plurality. There are three particles, which are attached to the end of words with a hyphen, used to signify plural.
 -влак (-vlak) – Standard plural form.
 -шамыч (-šamõč) – Alternative standard plural, used in many dialects. There is no difference in meaning between these two.
 -мыт (mõt) – Sociative plural. Used to signify a group of people: the members of a family, a person and their family and friends.

Possessive suffixes 
Every grammatical person in Mari has its own possessive suffix.

Additional suffixes 
Additional particles, falling into none of the categories above, can be added to the very end of a word, giving it some additional meaning. For example, the suffix -ат (-at), means 'also' or 'too'.

Arrangement of suffixes 
The arrangement of suffixes varies from case to case. Although the case suffixes are after the possessive suffixes in the genitive and the accusative, the opposite is the case for the locative cases. In the dative, both arrangements are possible.

There are many other arrangements in the plural—the position of the plural particle is flexible. The arrangement here is one commonly used possibility.

Comparison 
Comparison happens with adjectives and adverbs. The comparative is formed with the suffix -рак (-rak). The superlative is formed by adding the word эн (en) in front.

Conjugation 
Morphologically, conjugation follows three tenses and three moods in Meadow Mari.

Conjugation types 
In Meadow Mari, words can conjugate according to two conjugation types. These differ from each other in all forms but the infinitive and the third-person plural of the imperative. Unfortunately, the infinitive is the form denoted in dictionaries and word lists. It is, thus, necessary to either mark verb infinitives by their conjugation type in word lists, or to include a form in which the conjugation type is visible—usually, the first-person singular present, which ends in -ам (or -ям) for verbs in the first declination, and in -ем (or -эм) for second-declination verbs.

Tense 
The three tenses of Mari verbs are:
 Present

The present tense is used for present and future actions, for states of being and for habitual actions, among others.
 First preterite

The first preterite is used to express observed, recent actions.
 Second preterite

The second preterite is used for actions that are in the more-distant past.

Additional tenses can be formed through periphrasis.
 First periphrastic imperfect
 Second periphrastic imperfect
 First periphrastic perfect
 Second periphrastic perfect

Mood 
The moods are:
 Indicative

The indicative is used to express facts and positive beliefs. All intentions that a particular language does not categorize as another mood are classified as indicative. It can be formed in all persons, in all times.
 Imperative

The imperative expresses direct commands, requests, and prohibitions. It only exists in the present tense, and exists in all persons but the first person singular.
 Desiderative

The desiderative is used to express desires. It can be formed for all persons, in the present tense and in the two periphrastic imperfect.

Negation 
Negation in Mari uses a 'negative verb', much like Finnish does. The negative verb is more versatile than the negative verb in Finnish (see Finnish grammar), existing in more grammatical tenses and moods. It has its own form in the present indicative, imperative and desiderative, and in the first preterite indicative. Other negations are periphrastic.

The negation verb in its corresponding form is put in front of the negated verb in its second-person singular (the stem-only form), much as it is in Finnish and Estonian.

The verb улаш (ulaš) – to be – has its own negated forms.

Example 
In order to illustrate the conjugation in the respective moods and times, one verb of the first declination (лекташ – to go) and one verb of the second declination (мондаш – to forget) will be used.

 Bold letters are subject to vowel harmony—they can be е/о/ӧ, depending on the preceding full vowel.
 First-conjugation verb forms using the imperative second-person singular as their stem are subject to the same stem changes as the imperative – see imperative second-person singular.

 Bold letters are subject to vowel harmony—they can be е/о/ӧ, depending on the preceding full vowel.
 First-conjugation verb forms using the imperative second-person singular as their stem are subject to the same stem changes as the imperative – see imperative second-person singular.
 If the consonant prior to the ending can be palatalized—if it is л (l) or н (n)—it is palatalized in this position. Palatalization is not marked if the vowel following a consonant is an е.  колаш → кольым, кольыч, кольо, колна, колда, кольыч (to hear)

 Bold letters are subject to vowel harmony—they can be е/о/ӧ, depending on the preceding full vowel.
 First-conjugation verb forms using the imperative second-person singular as their stem are subject to the same stem changes as the imperative – see imperative second-person singular.

 Bold letters are subject to vowel harmony—they can be е/о/ӧ, depending on the preceding full vowel.
 First-conjugation verb forms using the imperative second-person singular as their stem are subject to the same stem changes as the imperative.
 In the first conjugation, the imperative second-person singular is formed by removing the -аш ending from the infinitive. Four consonant combinations are not allowed at the end of an imperative, and are thus simplified—one consonant is lost.  кт → к, нч → ч, чк → ч, шк → ш

 Bold letters are subject to vowel harmony—they can be е/о/ӧ, depending on the preceding full vowel.
 First-conjugation verb forms using the imperative second-person singular as their stem are subject to the same stem changes as the imperative – see imperative second-person singular.

 First-conjugation verb forms using the imperative second-person singular as their stem are subject to the same stem changes as the imperative – see imperative second-person singular.

 Bold letters are subject to vowel harmony—they can be е/о/ӧ, depending on the preceding full vowel.
 First-conjugation verb forms using the imperative second-person singular as their stem are subject to the same stem changes as the imperative – see imperative second-person singular.

Infinitive forms 
Verbs have two infinitive forms: the standard infinitive and the necessive infinitive, used when a person must do something. The person needing to do something is put in the dative in such a situation.

Participles 
There are four participles in Meadow Mari:
 Active participle
 Passive participle
 Negative participle
 Future participle

Gerunds 
There are five gerunds in Meadow Mari:
 Affirmative instructive gerund
 Negative instructive gerund
 Gerund for prior actions I
 Gerund for prior actions II
 Gerund for simultaneous actions

Syntax 

Word order in Mari is subject–object–verb.

Some common words and phrases 
Observation: Note that the accent mark, which denotes the place of stress, is not used in actual Mari orthography.

Bibliography 
  (Hill and Meadow);
 Alhoniemi, A., Marin kielen lukemisto sanastoineen, Helsinki, 1986 (Hill and Meadow);
 Beke О., Cseremisz nyelvtan, Budapest, 1911 (Hill and Meadow);
 Budenz J., Erdéi és hegyi cseremisz szótár, Pest, 1866 (Mari [Hill and Meadow], Hungarian, Latin);
 Castrén M. A., Elementa grammaticae tscheremissicae, Kuopio, 1845 (Hill);
 Glukhov, N. and V. Glukhov, "Mari Men and Women as Bearers of the Mari Language and Identity," Wiener elektronische Beiträge des Instituts für Finno-Ugristik, 2003. Available, along with other papers on Finno-Ugric languages and cultures* Ingemann, F. J. and T. A. Sebeok, An Eastern Cheremis Manual: Phonology, Grammar, Texts and Glossary (= American Council of Learned Societies, Research and Studies in Uralic and Altaic languages, project nos. 6 and 31), Bloomington, 1961 (Meadow);
 Klima, L. "The linguistic affinity of the Volgaic Finno-Ugrians and their ethnogenesis," 2004
 Kangasmaa-Minn, Eeva. 1998. Mari. In Daniel Abondolo (ed.), The Uralic Languages, 219-248. London: Routledge.
 Lewy E., Tscheremissische Grammatik, Leipzig, 1922 (Meadow);
 Ramstedt G. J., Bergtscheremissische Sprachstudien, Helsinki, 1902 (Hill);
 Räsänen M., Die tschuwassischen Lehnwörter im Tscheremissischen, Helsinki, 1920;
 Räsänen M., Die tatarischen Lehnwörter im Tscheremissischen, Helsinki, 1923.
 Sebeok, T. A. and A. Raun. (eds.), The First Cheremis Grammar (1775): A Facsimile Edition, Chicago, 1956.
 Szilasi M., Cseremisz szótár, Budapest, 1901 (Mari [Hill and Meadow], Hungarian, German);
 Wichmann Y., Tscheremissische Texte mit Wörterverzeichnis und grammatikalischem Abriss, Helsingfors, 1923 (Hill and Meadow);
 Wiedemann F., Versuch einer Grammatik der tscheremissischen Sprache, Saint Petersburg, 1847 (Hill);
 Васильев В. М., Записки по грамматике народа мари, Kazan', 1918 (Hill and Meadow);
 Васильев В. М., Марий Мутэр, Moscow, 1929 (Hill and Meadow);
 Галкин, И. С., Историческая грамматика марийского языка, vol. I, II, Yoshkar-Ola, 1964, 1966;
 Галкин, И. С., "Происхождение и развитие марийского языка", Марийцы. Историко-этнографические очерки/Марий калык. Историй сынан этнографий очерк-влак, Yoshkar-Ola, 2005: 43-46.
 Зорина, З. Г., Г. С. Крылова, and Э. С. Якимова. Марийский язык для всех, ч. 1. Йошкар-Ола: Марийское книжное издательство, * Кармазин Г. Г., Материалы к изучению марийского языка, Krasnokokshajsk, 1925 (Meadow);
 Иванов И. Г., История марийского литературного языка, Yoshkar-Ola, 1975;
 Иванов И. Г., Марий диалектологий, Yoshkar-Ola, 1981;
 Кармазин Г. Г., Учебник марийского языка лугово-восточного наречия, Yoshkar-Ola, 1929 (Meadow);
 Коведяева Е. И. "Марийский язык", Основы финно-угорского языкознания. Т.3. Moscow, 1976: 3-96.
 Коведяева Е. И. "Марийский язык", Языки мира: Уральские языки. Moscow, 1993: 148-164.
 Коведяева Е. И. "Горномарийский вариант литературного марийского языка", Языки мира: Уральские языки. Moscow, 1993: 164-173.
 Шорин В. С., Маро-русский словарь горного наречия, Kazan', 1920 (Hill);
 Троицкий В. П., Черемисско-русский словарь, Kazan', 1894 (Hill and Meadow);
1990;

References

External links

 Electronic Resources on the Mari Language
 English-Language Mari Textbook
 Kimberli Mäkäräinen's Meadow Mari Grammar
 Meadow Mari morphology generator
 Online dictionaries on Mari language

 
Uralic languages
Languages of Russia
Culture of Mari El